The Holy Trinity Church, Murree is a church located on The Mall, Murree.

History
Holy Trinity Church, Murree was founded in 1857. The construction work was completed in 1875. It was the main church of Murree during the colonial era.

In 1997, Queen Elizabeth II visited the church to pray there.

Building
The original church building was built with red brick, but was later converted into a grey-brick building.

References

Churches in Pakistan
Buildings and structures in Murree